Fabienne Meyer (born 28 November 1981) is a Swiss former bobsledder who has been competing since 2005.

She scored her first World Cup win in a two-woman event at Königssee, Germany in January 2014. The race also doubled as the women's Bobsleigh European Championship, earning Meyer a gold medal alongside brakewoman Tanja Mayer. Meyer had previously won a bronze medal at the European Championship in 2012.

Meyer won the World Junior Championships in Bobsleigh in February 2008.

Meyer's best finish at the FIBT World Championships was 6th in the two-woman event at Lake Placid, New York in 2012.

She competed with Hanne Schenk in the two-woman event at the 2010 Winter Olympics in Vancouver where they finished in tenth place. She also participated in the 2014 Winter Olympics.

Meyer retired from competition after the 2013-14 season.

European Championships
2014 European Championships –  Königssee,  with Tanja Mayer
2012 European Championships –  Altenberg,  with Hanne Schenk

References

External links
 

1981 births
Bobsledders at the 2010 Winter Olympics
Bobsledders at the 2014 Winter Olympics
Living people
Olympic bobsledders of Switzerland
Swiss female bobsledders
People from Langenthal
People from Willisau
Sportspeople from the canton of Bern